= Wired Shut =

- Directed by: Alexander Sharp
- Written by: Alexander Sharp; Peter Malone Elliott
- Produced by: Alexander Sharp; Peter Malone Elliott
- Starring: Blake Stadel; Natalie Sharp; Behtash Fazlali
- Cinematography: Martin Taube
- Edited by: Alexander Sharp; Blake Simon
- Music by: Oswald Dehnert; Rayshaun Thompson
- Production company: Sharpy
- Distributed by: 101 Films
- Release date: 30 August 2021
- Running time: 95 minutes
- Country: Canada
- Language: English

Wired Shut is a 2021 Canadian horror thriller film directed by Alexander Sharp, starring Blake Stadel, Natalie Sharp and Behtash Fazlali.

== Plot ==
Divorced writer Reed Rodney, who has recently had his jaw wired shut to recover from an accident, is visited by his estranged daughter Em. Reed is struggling working on a new book. Em argues with her father revealing he had numerous affairs and violently assaulted her mother, leading to the divorce.

One night Em's boyfriend Peyton sneaks in the house. Em and Peyton plan to steal the money in Reed's safe after drugging him, but Em is not able to coerce Reed to take medication. As the pair search the house for Reed, Em discovers an unfinished letter he has written to her, confessing sorrow for her tumultuous childhood. Peyton, using a gun which was not originally part of the plan, restrains Reed and Em with cable ties to get the safe combination from Reed. Reed relents after Em is threatened. Peyton reveals dating her was an opportunity to make a lot of money. Peyton takes Em upstairs to open the safe, but Reed escapes and retrieves his handgun from a safe. Peyton returns with Em and Reed shoots him, though the pair escape to the basement.

The badly wounded Peyton beats Reed and declares he will kill Em in front of him. Reed breaks his jaw to yell and as Peyton mocks him, Em grabs a cable tie and cinches it shut around Peyton's throat: he asphyxiates to death.

The next morning Em says she found the letter, and while she cannot forgive Reed, she is willing to forge a new relationship. In response Reed hands her the manuscript of his novella with a dedication saying he realized he could not say anything to heal the past but hopes the present can become something better. Em cries and the film ends.

== Cast ==
- Blake Stadel as Reed Rodney
- Natalie Sharp as Em
- Behtash Fazlali as Peyton

== Release ==
The film was released on 30 November 2021 via digital and VOD and on DVD on 25 January 2022.

== Reception ==
Robin Pierce of Starburst rated the film 3 stars out of 5. Michael Pementel of Bloody Disgusting gave the film a score of 3 out of 5, writing, "Compared to a lot of other films in the subgenre, Wired Shut proves to be an effective home invasion thriller with heart."
